The 1973 Rothmans International Vancouver, also known as the Vancouver WCT, was a men's professional tennis tournament that was part of Group B of the 1973 World Championship Tennis circuit. It was held on indoor carpet courts at the PNE Agrodome in Vancouver, British Columbia in Canada. It was the fourth and final edition of the tournament and was held from 25 March through 1 April 1973. Unseeded Tom Gorman won the singles title and earned $10,000 first-prize money.

Finals

Singles
 Tom Gorman defeated  Jan Kodeš 3–6, 6–2, 7–5
 It was Gorman's 1st singles title of the year and the 2nd of his career.

Doubles
 Pierre Barthès /  Roger Taylor defeated  Erik van Dillen /  Tom Gorman 5–7, 6–3, 7–6

References

Vancouver WCT Tournament
Tennis in Canada
1973 in Canadian tennis